William Mbevi Mutanga (born 12 July 1993) is a Kenyan athlete.

Career
He won the bronze medal at the Athletics at the 2010 Summer Youth Olympics – Boys' 400 metre hurdles. He finished fifth in the final of the 400m hurdles at the 2022 Commonwealth Games. At the same Games he then won a bronze medal as part of the Kenyan 4x400m relay team.

References

1993 births
Living people 
Athletes (track and field) at the 2022 Commonwealth Games
Commonwealth Games medallists in athletics
Kenyan male sprinters
21st-century Kenyan people
Commonwealth Games bronze medallists for Kenya
Medallists at the 2022 Commonwealth Games